Department of Theory and History of Political Science  - the structural unit of the Institute of social and political sciences, department of sociology and political science, Ural federal university named after the first President of Russia Boris Yeltsin.

History 
Department of Theory and History of Political Science emerged as the Department of History of Political Doctrines in 1994, many years, the department has successfully led prof., Doctor D.A. Mironov (at present - Professor University of Vienna, Austria).

Links 
 Official website of the Department of History and Political Science
 Laboratory of Regional Political Studies
 Training manuals and monographs employees of the Department of History and Political Science

Ural Federal University